Cirrhochrista saltusalis is a moth of the family Crambidae described by William Schaus in 1893. It is found in the Democratic Republic of the Congo, Cameroon and in Sierra Leone.

References

External links

Spilomelinae
Moths of Africa
Moths described in 1893